Logos Radio was the broadcast media outlet of the Orthodox Church of Cyprus. It was initially launched as a television and radio (1992) station, but the television broadcasting rights were later sold to Mega Channel in October 1999. It was transmitted on 101.1, 101.6, 101.7 and 101.9 FM. On 20 June 2018, it was replaced by Diesi FM Cyprus. The Greek word Λόγος (Logos) means "Reason" in English.

In 2018, Logos Radio started broadcasting again from the frequency of the local radio station of the parish of Agios Dimitrios, Acropolis of Nicosia, at 93.3 under the new name "Alithinos Logos" with also new national broadcasting license at 101.9 and 90.5.

External links
Logos Radio 93,3 - Church of Cyprus

Radio stations in Cyprus
Christian radio stations in Europe
Radio stations established in 1992
Radio stations disestablished in 2018
Defunct mass media in Cyprus
Defunct radio stations